Nathan Mark Adams (born 6 October 1991) is an English former professional footballer who played as a forward. He notably played briefly in the Football League for Lincoln City, before stints at Non-league level for Stamford, Lincoln Moorlands Railway and Lincoln United.

Career

Lincoln City
Adams joined the Centre of Excellence at Lincoln City at under-8 level and progressed through the centre to agree a two-year Apprenticeship for Sporting Excellence (ASE) scholarship with the club in May 2008.
 
Adams was drafted into The Imps squad during the 2008–2009 season. He made 2 appearances in total in his first season at Sincil Bank. His debut came on 18 April 2009 in the 1–0 defeat home against Exeter City. At the end of his scholarship, Adams alongside fellow scholars Kern Miller and Andy Hutchinson agreed a six-month professional contract with the club. In November 2010 he joined Stamford on a month's loan, debuting in the club's 1–0 defeat at Rushall Olympic on 6 November 2011.

Non-League
On 15 December 2010 his contract with the Imps was terminated by mutual consent and he joined Stamford on a permanent basis.

Having secured a new job, he elected to join a club closer to home and linked up with Lincoln Moorlands Railway, debuting in the club's Northern Counties East League 4–3 defeat at home to Scarborough Athletic on 16 February 2011. He opened his goalscoring account for the club with a hat-trick in the following game, an 8–2 away victory over Armthorpe Welfare on 19 February 2011, and went on to net 11 league goals for the club in the 2010–2011 season.

In February 2015, after a spell away from the game due to work commitments, he joined Spalding United.

References

External links

1991 births
Living people
Sportspeople from Lincoln, England
English footballers
Association football forwards
Lincoln City F.C. players
Stamford A.F.C. players
Lincoln United F.C. players
English Football League players
Lincoln Moorlands Railway F.C. players